Marne is a département in the Grand Est region of France. It is named after the river Marne which flows through it.  The prefecture (capital) of Marne is Châlons-en-Champagne (formerly known as Châlons-sur-Marne). The subprefectures are Épernay, Reims, and Vitry-le-François. It had a population of 566,855 in 2019.

The Champagne vineyards producing the eponymous sparkling wine are in Marne.

Name
The department is named after the Marne, which was called Matrona in Roman times.

History
Marne is one of the original 83 departments created during the French Revolution on March 4, 1790. It was created from the province of Champagne.

Marne has a long association with the French Army. The training ground of the Camp Militaire de Mailly straddles the border with the département of Aube in the south while that of the Camp de Mourmelon occupies a large area north of Châlons-en-Champagne. The smaller Camp de Moronvilliers lies to the east of Reims and the Camp Militaire de Suippes lies to the east of that. These are all located on the chalk grounds of the Champagne plateau, a feature comparable in geology but not size, with the British military training ground on Salisbury Plain.

The Battles of the Marne, where the British and French fought against Germany during World War I, took place here.

Geography
Marne is part of the region of Grand Est and is surrounded by the departments of Ardennes, Meuse, Haute-Marne, Aube, Seine-et-Marne, and Aisne.

Geologically, it divides into two distinct parts; the Upper Cretaceous chalk plain in the east and the more wooded and hilly Eocene and Oligocene in the west.

Rivers draining the department include the Marne, Vesle, Ardre and Somme-Soude. Numerous other rivers, such as the Grande and the Petite Morin rise in the department but flow mainly in others. Conversely, the Aube joins the Seine in the department of Marne.

Principal towns

The most populous commune in the department is Reims; the prefecture Châlons-en-Champagne is the second-most populous. As of 2019, there are five communes with more than 10,000 inhabitants:

Demographics
The inhabitants of the department are called Marnais.

Population development since 1801:

Politics

The president of the Departmental Council is Christian Bruyen, elected in 2017.

Presidential elections 2nd round

Current National Assembly Representatives

Tourism
Reims, with its cathedral in which the kings of France were traditionally crowned, is a major attraction. Others include the bird reserve on the Lake Der-Chantecoq and the fishing lakes nearby. The Parc Naturel Régional de la Montagne de Reims is a major area of country recreation. In the west of the département there are many scenic routes as also are the several wine cellars of Épernay.

See also
 Arrondissements of the Marne department
 Cantons of the Marne department
 Champagne Riots
 Communes of the Marne department
 French wine

References

External links

  Prefecture website 
  Departmental Council website 

  
   Official Tourist Board

 
1790 establishments in France
Departments of Grand Est
States and territories established in 1790